Chionothremma auriflua is a species of moth of the family Tortricidae. It is found in New Guinea.

References

Moths described in 1952
Chionothremma
Taxa named by Alexey Diakonoff